College is a 1990 Italian comedy television series, based on the 1983/4 film College. It aired on Tuesdays at 20.30 in Italy from March 6 to June 5, 1990 for a total of 14 episodes. The episodes were directed by Lorenzo Castellano and Federico Moccia. The music for the series was provided by Claudio Simonetti. The female lead in the series is Federica Moro, Miss Italy, while her male counterpart, and her boyfriend, is Keith Van Hoven.

The college featured in the series is located near the Naval Academy in the heart of Tuscany.  The show was produced by Reteitalia and had excellent results in the ratings, with a peak of 6 million viewers per episode. It has since been re-run on numerous satellite channels.

Cast
Federica Moro: Arianna Silvestri
Keith Van Hoven: Marco Poggi 
Fabrizio Bracconeri: Carletto Staccioli
Fabio Ferrari: Capocamerata Emilio Baldani 
George Hilton: Colonnello Armando Madison 
Lara Wendel: Beatrice Barbieri 
Nico Davenia: Pietro Rocco ("Roccia") 
Katalyn Hoffner: Samantha
Gérard Bonn: Diego Sanchez 
Jessi Calzà: Vally Chiaro 
Daniele Giarratana: Paul Dupont 
Raffaella Monti: Cinzia Bernardini 
Cristina Giani: Samantha 
Ann Margaret Hughes: Prof.ssa Muller 
Roberto Della Casa: Capitano Salice 
Stefano Masciarelli: Marcello il barista
Anna Teresa Rossini: Dott.ssa Marisa Ricci
Deborah Cocco: Elena
Aldina Martano: Silvia
Renee Rancourt: Manuela (ep. Carletto innamorato)
Antonio Zequila: Giulio Carta (ep. Il bellimbusto)

See also
List of Italian television series

References

External links
 

1990 Italian television series debuts
1990 Italian television series endings
1990s college television series
1990s sitcoms
Italian comedy television series
Italian-language television shows
Television shows set in Tuscany
Italia 1 original programming